The LMS Turbomotive was a modified LMS Princess Royal Class steam turbine locomotive designed by William Stanier and built by the London, Midland and Scottish Railway in 1935. It was inspired by the Swedish Ljungström locomotives first introduced in 1922. It used turbines instead of cylinders. It was later rebuilt as a conventional locomotive No. 46202 Princess Anne.

Design 

The locomotive chassis was constructed as the third prototype of the LMS Princess Royal Class, utilising the class frame design, and numbered 6202.

The forward turbine had 18 rows of blading.

The reverse turbine had four rows of blades. It was engaged by a dog clutch, activated when the reverser lever was set to "0". This was originally steam-operated by a small piston and cylinder.

Compared to some other experimental steam locomotives of the era, such as the LNER's W1, Turbomotive was relatively successful, showing a saving of coal compared to a normal reciprocating engine and no hammer blow on the track. Because steam turbines are highly inefficient when throttled (not a problem on steamships, where turbines typically run at constant output, but a major disadvantage for a railway locomotive which has to run at different speeds), power was instead controlled by turning on a different number of nozzles (from the six available) through which steam was admitted to the turbine. One disadvantage of the design was that the small reverse turbine only had sufficient power for manoeuvring "light engine" and the locomotive always had to be turned to face forwards in order to pull a train.

When a turbine failure occurred in 1949, it was considered uneconomic to repair during post-war austerity measures, so the locomotive was taken out of service pending a rebuild.

46202 Princess Anne 
46202 was rebuilt as a conventional locomotive in 1952, using new mainframes and a set of cylinders of the same type as used in the "Coronation" Class, and named Princess Anne. On 8 October 1952, after only two months in service, it was the train engine of the double-headed Liverpool and Manchester express involved in the Harrow and Wealdstone rail crash. The locomotive was taken to Crewe, where it was deemed beyond economical repair and scrapped. The destruction of No. 46202 led to the construction of BR Standard Class 8 number 71000, Duke of Gloucester.

See also
British Rail GT3
Pennsylvania Railroad S2 class

References

Literature

External links
Pictures
Technical specifications

Turbomotive
8 Turbomotive
4-6-2 locomotives
Experimental locomotives
Individual locomotives of Great Britain
Railway locomotives introduced in 1935
Scrapped locomotives
Standard gauge steam locomotives of Great Britain
Ljungström
Passenger locomotives